Wendall Miller (born 3 January 2003) is a Bahamian sprinter who competes in the 200 and 400. He attended St.Johns College in Nassau, Bahamas where he won multiple Bahamas Association of Independent Secondary Schools Track and Field "B.A.I.S.S" gold medals. After a break out 2021 season he signed a professional contract with Puma, and will be training with MVP International, under former Auburn University coach Henry Rolle based in Boca Raton, Florida.
He holds the Bahamian 400m Jr National Record with a time of 45.81 . He also has a personal best of 20.61 (+1.1w) over 200m. 

During the 2019 Carifta Games held in the Cayman Islands he won gold in the under 17 400m before teaming up to secure silver in the 4x100 relay.
He also competed in the 100m and 200m at the 2021 World Athletics U20 Championships in Nairobi, Kenya.

Personal bests

References

External links
 Wendell MILLER | Profile | World Athletics

2003 births
Living people
Bahamian male sprinters